Creel is a surname. Notable people with the surname include:

People
The Creel-Terrazas  family of Mexican politicians and industrialists:
 Enrique Creel (1854–1931), Mexican politician and industrialist, namesake of Creel, Chihuahua
 Santiago Creel (born 1954), Mexican politician
Gavin Creel (born 1976), American actor and singer
George Creel (1876–1953), American journalist, politician, and head of Committee on Public Information 
Herrlee Glessner Creel (1905–1994), American sinologist and philosopher
Jack Creel (1916–2002), American Major League Baseball pitcher
Leanna Creel (born 1970), American actress and film producer
Walton Creel (born 1974), American artist
William Jackson Creel, American doctor and namesake for several Florida structures

Fictional characters
 Carl "Crusher" Creel, the Absorbing Man, in Marvel Comics universe.
 Catalina Creel, a villain (played by the actress María Rubio) in the Mexican telenovela Cuna de lobos.
 Panamon Creel, a character from the novel The Sword of Shannara by Terry Brooks.
 Padishar Creel, a recurring character from the Shannara series by Terry Brooks, first appearing in The Scions of Shannara.
 Victor Creel, a recurring character in the fourth season of Stranger Things.
 Henry Creel, main antagonist in the fourth season of Stranger Things.